In measure theory, given a measurable space  and a signed measure  on it, a set  is called a  for  if every -measurable subset of  has nonnegative measure; that is, for every  that satisfies   holds. 

In the light of Radon–Nikodym theorem, if  is a σ-finite positive measure such that  a set  is a positive set for  if and only if the Radon–Nikodym derivative  is nonnegative -almost everywhere on  Similarly, a negative set is a set where  -almost everywhere.

Properties 

It follows from the definition that every measurable subset of a positive or negative set is also positive or negative. Also, the union of a sequence of positive or negative sets is also positive or negative; more formally, if  is a sequence of positive sets, then

is also a positive set; the same is true if the word "positive" is replaced by "negative".

A set which is both positive and negative is a -null set, for if  is a measurable subset of a positive and negative set  then both  and  must hold, and therefore,

Hahn decomposition 

The Hahn decomposition theorem states that for every measurable space  with a signed measure  there is a partition of  into a positive and a negative set; such a partition  is unique up to -null sets, and is called a Hahn decomposition of the signed measure 

The same is true for negative sets, if  is used instead of

See also

References 

Measure theory